Over the Rainbow (A Compilation of Rarities 1981–1983) is a compilation album by the Irish rock band Virgin Prunes. It was issued by Baby Records in April 1985. In 1986, the album was issued on CD augmented with the studio recordings from Hérésie.

Track listing

Personnel 

Virgin Prunes
 Mary D'Nellon – drums
 Dik Evans – guitar
 Gavin Friday – vocals
 Guggi – vocals
 Strongman – bass guitar

Technical personnel
 Virgin Prunes – production

Charts

Release history

References

External links 
 

1985 compilation albums
Virgin Prunes albums